The RSCM Millennium Youth Choir is a British choir for singers aged between 15 and 23. It is the RSCM's leading national choir.

In 1999 the Archbishop of Canterbury at the time, George Carey, suggested its formation and it gave its first performance in the Millennium Dome in London.

The choir has around 40 auditioned members in each season. The choir meets 3 times a year for courses around the United Kingdom and abroad, singing in some of the country's finest churches and cathedrals.

Conductors
The choir has been led by a number of conductors associated with the RSCM:

 1999-2001 : Martin Neary
 2002-2004 : Gordon Stewart
 2005-2014 : David Ogden
 2015- : Adrian Lucas

Recordings, concerts and broadcasts
The choir has made numerous broadcasts for the BBC on Radio 2, Radio 3, Radio 4, Radio Wales and BBC One on the Songs of Praise programme.

In September 2009, the choir made its BBC Proms debut, joining members of other UK-based youth choirs to perform Handel's Messiah at the Royal Albert Hall with the Northern Sinfonia, conducted by Nicholas McGegan.

In 2002 the choir recorded their first album, A Land of Pure Delight. In 2007 the choir recorded another album as part of the RSCM's 80th-anniversary celebrations, entitled Out of the Stillness.

External links
Official website
The RSCM's page on the choir

British Christian musical groups
Musical groups established in 1999
1999 establishments in the United Kingdom